Flight from Folly is a 1945 British musical comedy film directed and produced by Herbert Mason, in his last directorial credit before moving onto production, for Warner Bros. It stars Pat Kirkwood and Hugh Sinclair, with music from Edmundo Ros and the Rumba Band.  Kirkwood had appeared in minor roles in four films between 1938 and 1940 before focussing her career on the West End stage, where she had become a major star during the war years.  Flight from Folly was designed to give Kirkwood her first starring screen role, with the hope of breaking her out as a big-name film attraction.

Plot
When his muse and girlfriend Nina (Tamara Desni) takes off with a continental lothario, composer and playwright Clinton Clay (Sinclair) is devastated and turns to drink for solace.  His doctor (Sydney Howard) tries, with the help of Clinton's butler Neville (A. E. Matthews), to get him to pull himself together but all attempts fail as Clinton's behaviour becomes ever more unbalanced and every nurse they engage is sent on her way by him in quick order.

Showgirl Sue Brown (Kirkwood) is currently out of work, hears of Clinton's problems and poses as a nurse.  She is taken on to be his keeper, and manages to placate him to the extent that he does not dismiss her.  When Clinton decides to travel to Majorca in pursuit of Nina, Sue is included in the party along with Neville and Clinton's sculptor sister Millicent (Jean Gillie).  Harriet (Marian Spencer), a devious widow with designs on Clinton, follows them to Majorca.

Once on the island, Clinton tracks Nina down and asks her to star in a tryout of a new musical he has written.  She agrees, and Clinton makes arrangements to stage the musical there.  On opening night however, the jealous Harriet locks Nina in her dressing room and disappears with the key.  Sue offers to take Nina's place on stage, and proves to be a huge success with the audience.  Clinton realises that he has fallen in love with her and is instantly cured of his malaise, happy now to let Nina go with her playboy lover.

Cast
 Pat Kirkwood as Sue Brown
 Hugh Sinclair as Clinton Gray
 Tamara Desni as Nina
 Sydney Howard as Dr. Wylie
 Jean Gillie as Millicent
 A. E. Matthews as Neville
 Charles Goldner as Ramon
 Marian Spencer as Harriet
 Leslie Bradley as Bomber
 Edmundo Ros as Himself

Production

It was the last film made at Warner's Teddington Studios before it was bombed in 1944.

Reception and later history
Flight from Folly received a generally muted critical reception, with a degree of agreement that the cast, in particular Kirkwood herself, were better than the material they had to work with. The Daily Mail described the film as "a tremulous but definite step towards a school of British Musicians." The Manchester Guardian called the film "unworthy of [Kirkwood's] limited but genuine talent" which "promises better work in better films". The Daily Mirror however found the film a "neatly made and tuneful comedy" with praise for Kirkwood's "vivacious personality and talent".  The film's set designs, costuming and make-up provoked criticism from a number of reviewers.

There is no indication of what happened to the film after its original cinema run in 1945. The film does not appear ever to have been shown on television, and attempts to track down a print have so far proved fruitless. Also, the film is not held in the British Film Institute National Archive, is classed as "missing, believed lost", and is included on the BFI's "75 Most Wanted" list of missing British feature films.

See also
List of lost films

References

Bibliography

 Quinlan, David. (1984). British Sound Films: The Studio Years 1928-1959. BT Batsford Ltd
 Wright, Adrian. (2020). Cheer Up! British Musical Films, 1929-1945. Boydell Press

External links
 
 Flight from Folly at BFI
 Flight from Folly at AllMovie

1945 musical comedy films
1945 films
British musical comedy films
British black-and-white films
1940s English-language films
Films directed by Herbert Mason
Films produced by Herbert Mason
Films scored by Benjamin Frankel
Lost British films
1940s lost films
Lost musical comedy films
Films scored by Eric Spear
1940s British films